Sweet potato jam can refer to:
Camote halaya, a traditional Filipino dessert made from mashed sweet potatoes, coconut milk, sugar, and butter
Dulce de batata (or doce de batata), a traditional South American jelly made from sweet potatoes